Mike Makes His Mark is a 1955 educational American film directed by Irving Rusinow and produced by Agrafilms, Inc. for the National Education Association (NEA) and state education associations.

The film tells the story of 8th grader "Mike" who wishes to drop out of school, but with help from his teacher and guidance counselor finds activities that make him interested in school, while his friend Eddie is a ditch digger.

The film was the fifth in a series of NEA educational films, and it debuted at the NEA's annual convention in Chicago in July 1955.

Credits
 Director - Irving Rusinow
 Script - Jarvis Couillard
 Photography - Pinckney Ridgell
 Editing - Wilkes Straley
 Music - Norman Lloyd

References

External links
 Mike Makes His Mark at archive.org (full film)
 

1955 films
1950s educational films
American documentary films
1950s English-language films
1950s American films
1955 documentary films
American black-and-white films
American educational films